Cuero Independent School District is a public school district based in Cuero, Texas (USA).

Located in DeWitt County, a small portion of the district extends into Gonzales County.

Middle and high school students from the community of Nursery may choose between Victoria ISD or Cuero Independent School District. Because of this, the district also serves some residents from Victoria County.
In 2009, the school district was rated "academically acceptable" by the Texas Education Agency.

Schools
Cuero High School (Grades 9-12)
Cuero Junior High School (Grades 6-8)
Hunt Elementary School (Grades 2-5)
French Elementary School (Grades PK-1)

References

External links
 

School districts in DeWitt County, Texas
School districts in Gonzales County, Texas
School districts in Victoria County, Texas